The Mauritius Open was a golf tournament played on the island of Mauritius from 1994 through 2008. In 2009 the tournament was superseded by a new European Seniors Tour event, named the Mauritius Commercial Bank Open.

Winners

External links
Official site
List of winners

Golf tournaments in Mauritius
Recurring sporting events established in 1994
Recurring sporting events disestablished in 2008
Defunct sports competitions in Mauritius
1994 establishments in Mauritius